Michael Walter William Selvey (born 25 April 1948), known as Mike Selvey, is an English former Test and county cricketer, and now a cricket writer and commentator. Selvey played in three Tests for England in 1976 and 1977. His county cricket commitments included service to Surrey, Middlesex and Glamorgan. He is currently President of Middlesex.

Life and career
Selvey was educated at Honeywell Primary School, Battersea Grammar School, the University of Manchester and Emmanuel College, Cambridge. He played cricket for Surrey and Cambridge University before joining Middlesex in 1972, where he spent the majority of his playing career.

Selvey made a dramatic debut in Test cricket against the West Indies at Old Trafford in 1976, when he opened the bowling and took the wickets of Roy Fredericks, Viv Richards and Alvin Kallicharran for only six runs in his first 20 balls. He took 4 for 41 in that innings, and 6 for 152 in the match, but still ended on the losing side as England were beaten by 425 runs.

He only played two more Tests and failed to take a single wicket in either of them, in part due to Alan Knott dropping a routine chance from Roy Fredericks in Selvey's second test at the Oval in the same year; the West Indies went on to make 687 as England were blunted by Viv Richards' 291.

Despite playing no more international cricket after 1977, Selvey was a key part of a Middlesex attack that won the County Championship outright three times (1976, 1980 and 1982) and shared the title once (1977). He was also in the Middlesex teams that won two Gillette Cups, in 1977 (when his figures were 12–4–22–2) and in 1980 in a London derby final against Surrey, when he again bowled a tight spell (12-5-17-2) to restrict the opposition. Selvey took 101 first-class wickets for Middlesex in the 1978 season, a feat that has not been matched by any Middlesex fast bowler since.

Selvey features in Mike Brearley's The Art of Captaincy and is quoted by Brearley as lamenting his notable skills as an into-the-wind bowler by remarking that his nose seemed to get flatter every year, as he would invariably be asked to bowl into the wind whilst Wayne Daniel and Vince van der Bijl bowled downhill with the wind behind them.

In 1983 he moved to Glamorgan as captain, but persistent injuries forced him to retire after only a season and a half.

Shortly after his retirement from playing cricket, Selvey became cricket correspondent of The Guardian newspaper.  He retired on 23 September 2016 after 31 years in the role.

He also joined BBC Radio's Test Match Special as a summariser, beginning with England's 1984 tour to India; he continued with this role until being dropped from the team in 2008. Selvey has since become a regular summariser and guest on Talksport.

Publications
The Ashes Surrendered: The Guardian Book of the 1989 Ashes Series, Queen Anne Press, 1989

References

External links
 
 Mike Selvey Guardian Profile and Articles
 Mike Selvey Test Match Special Profile

1948 births
Living people
England Test cricketers
English cricketers
Cambridge University cricketers
Free State cricketers
Glamorgan cricketers
Glamorgan cricket captains
Marylebone Cricket Club cricketers
Middlesex cricketers
Surrey cricketers
Cricket historians and writers
English cricket commentators
The Guardian journalists
Presidents of Middlesex County Cricket Club
Alumni of the University of Manchester
Alumni of Emmanuel College, Cambridge
People educated at Battersea Grammar School
T. N. Pearce's XI cricketers